Fluntern is a quarter in the district 7 in Zürich, Switzerland. It was formerly a municipality of its own, having been incorporated into Zürich in 1893. The quarter has a population of 7,325 distributed on an area of 2.84 km².

Notable features
The Zürich Zoologischer Garten, opened in 1929, is located in this quarter.

Built in 1901 as Rigiblick restaurant, the former Gastsaal was re-opened as Theater Rigiblick in 1984.

Climate

References

District 7 of Zürich
Former municipalities of the canton of Zürich